Pingnan County is an inland county in northeastern Fujian province, People's Republic of China. It is located in the cultural region of Mindong, and lies in the west of Ningde City.

Administration 
The population of Pingnan stands at 181 300 residents, of whom 35,700 are urban resident. (2003)

The county executive, legislature and judiciary are seated at Gufeng Town, together with the CPC and PSB branches.

Towns 
 Gufeng
 Shuangxi (双溪镇)
 Daixi
 Changqiao

Townships 
 Pingcheng
 Tangkou
 Gantang
 Yiling
 Luxia
 Shoushan
 Lingxia

Climate

History
Pingnan was established as a county in Qing Dynasty in 1735.

Local historical monuments include the Wan'an Bridge, located in the appropriately named  Changqiao ("long bridge") Township. The bridge, described as the "longest woven timber bridge in China", was originally built in 1648, and rebuilt a number of times since.

Agriculture
Pingnan is "the capital of summer mushrooms", and the annual produce of Xiangu mushrooms is more than 6,000 tons. It is the largest export base of summer mushrooms in China. Pingnan also is famous for fruits such as Younai plums, seedless persimmons, chinquapis, yangtaos, and Wuyan peas.

See also
Ningde
Eastern Min dialect
Mindong people
Fujian

References

External links
Ningde government website 

County-level divisions of Fujian
Ningde